Site Lange Max is a private domain,  from the center of Koekelare, Belgium.

The Site
The site is located on an old farmyard and contains the remains of the former biggest gun in the world (1917), the Lange Max. The site also includes Lange Max Museum, the artillery platform of the Batterie Pommern, a mess, and the Cafeteria De Lange Max. The farmyard, mess, and artillery platform are protected heritage buildings. These elements together have ensured that the whole as village view was protected.

War Memorial

On June 24, 2017, a new war memorial was revealed near the artillery platform of Lange Max.

References

External links

 

World War I museums in Belgium
Museums in West Flanders
Military and war museums in Belgium
History museums in Belgium
World War I sites in Belgium
Koekelare